Lukoyanovsky Uyezd (Лукояновский уезд) was one of the subdivisions of the Nizhny Novgorod Governorate of the Russian Empire. It was situated in the southeastern part of the governorate. Its administrative centre was Lukoyanov.

Demographics
At the time of the Russian Empire Census of 1897, Lukoyanovsky Uyezd had a population of 193,454. Of these, 85.2% spoke Russian, 14.3% Mordvin and 0.3% Belarusian as their native language.

References

 
Uezds of Nizhny Novgorod Governorate
Nizhny Novgorod Governorate